Case Closed, also known as , is a Japanese detective manga series written and illustrated by Gosho Aoyama. It has been serialized in Shogakukan's shōnen manga magazine Weekly Shōnen Sunday since January 1994, with its chapters collected in 102 tankōbon volumes as of September 2022. Due to legal problems with the name Detective Conan, the English language releases from Funimation and Viz Media were renamed to Case Closed. The story follows the high school detective Shinichi Kudo, whose body was transformed into that of an elementary school-age child while investigating a mysterious organization and generally solved a multitude of cases by impersonating his childhood best friend's father and various other characters.

The manga was adapted into an anime television series by Yomiuri Telecasting Corporation and TMS Entertainment, which premiered in January 1996. The anime resulted in animated feature films, original video animations, video games, audio disc releases and live action episodes. Funimation licensed the anime series for North American broadcast in 2003 under the name Case Closed with the characters given Americanized names. The anime premiered on Adult Swim but was discontinued due to low ratings.

In March 2013, Funimation began streaming their licensed episodes of Case Closed; Crunchyroll simulcast them in 2014. Funimation also localized the first six Case Closed films, while Discotek Media localized the Lupin III crossover special, its film sequel, and select recent films, starting with Case Closed Episode One. Meanwhile, the manga was localized by Viz Media, which used Funimation's changed title and character names. Shogakukan Asia made its own localized English version of the manga, which used the original title and Japanese names.

The tankōbon volumes of the manga had over 270 million copies in circulation worldwide by January 2023, making it the third best-selling manga series of all time. In 2001, the manga was awarded the 46th Shogakukan Manga Award in the shōnen category. The anime adaptation has been well received and ranked in the top twenty in Animages polls between 1996 and 2001. In the Japanese anime television ranking, Case Closed episodes ranked in the top six weekly. Both the manga and the anime have had a positive response from critics for their plot and cases. The manga has been sold in 25 countries, while the anime has been broadcast in 40 countries.

Plot

Jimmy Kudo (Japanese name: Shinichi Kudo) is a high school detective who sometimes works with the police to solve cases. During an investigation, he is ambushed and incapacitated by a member of a crime syndicate known as the Black Organization. In an attempt to murder the young detective, they force-fed him a dangerous experimental drug. However, instead of killing him, it shrinks his body into the size of an elementary school child. Adopting the pseudonym Conan Edogawa and keeping his true identity a secret, Kudo lives with his childhood friend Rachel Moore (Ran Mori) and her father Richard (Kogoro Mori), who is a private detective. Throughout the series, he tags along on Richard's cases. Nonetheless, after Kudo solves one, he will use Dr. Agasa's hidden tranquilizer to sedate Richard and then uses a voice changer to simulate his voice to reveal the solution. He also enrolls in Teitan Elementary School where he makes friends with a group of classmates who form their own Junior Detective League (Detective Boys). While he continues to dig deeper into the Black Organization, he frequently interacts with other characters, including his neighbor, Dr. Agasa, Ran's friend Serena Sebastian (Sonoko Suzuki), a fellow teenage detective Harley Hartwell (Heiji Hattori), assorted police detectives from different regions, and a phantom thief called the Kaito Kid.

Kudo later encounters an elementary school transfer student, Anita Hailey (Ai Haibara), who reveals herself to be a former member of the Black Organization under the code name "Sherry" and the creator of the experimental drug that shrunk him. She too had ingested it to evade the pursuit of the organization. She soon joins the Junior Detectives. During a rare encounter with the Black Organization, Conan helps the FBI plant a CIA agent, Kir, inside the Black Organization as a spy.

Production

Case Closed was conceived in 1994, during the rise of mystery genre manga due to the publishing of the series The Kindaichi Case Files; the first chapter appeared in Shogakukan's Weekly Shōnen Sunday on January 19. Aoyama cites the stories of Arsène Lupin, Sherlock Holmes and the samurai films by Akira Kurosawa as influences on his work. When scripting each chapter, he ensures the dialogue remains simple and spends an average of four hours for each new case and twelve for more complicated ones. Aoyama's older brother is a scientist who helps him out with the "gimmicks" in the series. Each case spans several chapters (except for a handful of shorter cases that only span one), and is resolved at the end where characters explain the details of their solutions in simple terms; an online database consisting of all the cases from the manga was launched in 2007. In 2007, Aoyama hinted he had an ending planned out but does not intend to end the series yet. Aoyama and his staff decided to computerize their manga creation process in early 2011, although he still draws with a pen and paper. The change began with the final page of chapter 760.

Release

Case Closed, written and illustrated by Gosho Aoyama, has been serialized in Shogakukan's shōnen manga magazine Weekly Shōnen Sunday since January 19, 1994. Case Closed became the 24th longest running manga series, with over 1000 chapters released in Japan, and the first series with over 1000 chapters published in Weekly Shōnen Sunday. Shogakukan has collected its chapters into individual tankōbon volumes. The first volume was released on June 18, 1994. On October 18, 2021, the series reached one hundred volumes; One Piece author, Eiichiro Oda, whose series achieved the same feat a month before, sent congratulations to Aoyama. As of September 15, 2022, 102 volumes have been published.

Viz Media announced its acquisition of the series for North America on June 1, 2004. Following Funimation's localization, Viz released the series as Case Closed and took their character names to keep consistency between the two media. Viz Media released the first volume in September 2004 and began releasing digital editions in 2013. Gollancz licensed and distributed 15 of Viz Media's volumes in the United Kingdom before ceasing publication of manga. (Viz Media has since re-released them). In 2014 Shogakukan Asia began its own English localization of the series for Singapore and other Southeast Asian countries as Detective Conan. Laura Thornton of CBR.com, citing the common Japanese ownership in both Shogakukan Asia and Viz, described the Singapore version as, compared to the Viz one, "completely identical, word-for-word, even -- save for the names and the Detective Conan logo".

The manga has also been localized in other regions such as China, France, Germany and Indonesia.  Localizations in Scandinavia ceased one by one, Finland being the last in 2013, when the publisher shut down the entire manga division.

Spin-offs 

Gosho Aoyama's assistants have written an anthology series of Case Closed which are released irregularly.

A spin-off manga series, titled Case Closed: The Culprit Hanzawa, by Mayuko Kanba, began in the July 2017 issue of Shogakukan's Shōnen Sunday S, released on May 25, 2017.

Another spin-off manga series, illustrated by Takahiro Arai with supervision by Aoyama, titled Case Closed: Zero's Tea Time started in issue #24 of Weekly Shōnen Sunday on May 9, 2018. The story centers on the agent Toru Amuro/Rei Furuya. New chapters of the manga are only published when Case Closed is on hiatus.

Another spin-off manga series by Arai, titled Detective Conan: Police Academy Arc – Wild Police Story, was serialized in Weekly Shōnen Sunday from October 2, 2019 to November 18, 2020. Spanning 13 chapters, it again focuses on Amuro/Furuya during his years in the police academy with his colleagues.

Media adaptations

Anime

The anime version of Case Closed is produced by Yomiuri Telecasting Corporation and TMS Entertainment. Over 1000 episodes have aired in Japan since the anime's premiere on January 8, 1996, making it the fifteenth longest anime series to date. Initially, Shogakukan collected and released the episodes on VHS video cassettes from June 1996 to October 2006. Four hundred and twenty-six episodes were released on VHS until Shogakukan abandoned the format and switched over to DVDs, starting over from the first episode. For the fifteenth anniversary of the anime series, the series was made available for video on demand. The series celebrated its 25th anniversary in January 2021, and the "Moonlight Sonata Murder Case" episode (11th episode of the series) was given the remake treatment as the first part of its celebration, which featured the latest staff and production techniques, and classical pianist Aimi Kobayashi performed Beethoven's Piano Sonata No. 14 for the episode. It aired on March 6, 2021.

In 2003, the first 104 episodes, as well as the first six movies were licensed by Funimation for distribution in North America, under the title Case Closed because of legal considerations. The Case Closed anime has also been released in other languages such as French, German and Italian. Case Closed debuted on Cartoon Network as part of their Adult Swim programming block on May 24, 2004; no more than 50 episodes were licensed from Funimation due to low ratings. The Canadian channel YTV picked up the Case Closed series and broadcast 22 episodes between April 7, 2006, and September 2, 2006, before taking it off the air. Funimation made the series available with the launch of the Funimation Channel in November 2005; it was temporary available on Colours TV during its syndication with the Funimation Channel.  Case Closed was later broadcast in North America on NHK's cable network TV Japan. Funimation lost the rights to the series in 2018. Crunchyroll began simulcasting the series in October 2014, starting with episode 754. In September 2020, Crunchyroll began streaming the first 43 episodes (the two-part episodes 11-12 considered as a single episode).

A separate English adaptation of the series was made by Voiceovers Unlimited Pte Ltd. in Singapore. Another one by Animax Asia premiered in the Philippines on January 18, 2006, under the name Detective Conan. Because Animax were unable to obtain further TV broadcast rights, their version comprised only 52 episodes. The series continued with reruns until August 7, 2006, when it was removed from the station. Both the Singapore and Philippines versions used Japanese character names. The California-based channel United Television Broadcasting (UTB) aired it with English subtitles from 2011 to 2014, until episode 421.

Funimation also released DVDs of their dubbed series beginning August 24, 2004. Initially, the releases were done in single DVDs and future episodes were released in seasonal boxes; 130 episodes have been released in total. The seasonal boxes were later re-released in redesigned boxes called Viridian edition. Funimation began streaming Case Closed episodes in March 2013. Hanabee Entertainment licensed the series for distribution in Australia.

In January 2016, 52 episodes of the anime appeared on Netflix, initially under its original title Detective Conan before changing to its English moniker Case Closed. The episodes were listed as "season one", although in reality they are episodes #748 to #799. The episodes were only available in Japanese, but were subtitled. The availability was likely part of Netflix's efforts to expand its anime catalog. In January 2021, Netflix removed the episodes. As of 2018, the Detective Conan anime has been broadcast in 40 countries around the world.

In February 2023, episodes of the anime appeared on Tubi, with an English dub, starting at #965. This is the first time since 2010 that any episodes of the main anime series have been dubbed and released in English.

Films

Twenty-five feature films based on the Case Closed series have been released. They are animated by TMS Entertainment and produced by Yomiuri Telecasting Corporation, Nippon Television, ShoPro, and Toho. The first seven were directed by Kenji Kodama, films 8–14 were directed by Yasuichiro Yamamoto, films 15-21 were directed by Kobun Shizuno, film 22 was directed by Yuzuru Tachikawa, films 23 and 24 were directed by Chika Nagaoka, and film 25 was directed by Susumu Mitsunaka. The films have been released in April of each year, starting in 1997 with the first film, Case Closed: The Time Bombed Skyscraper. The 25th film, Detective Conan: The Bride of Halloween was released on April 15, 2022. The second film and onwards were the top twenty grossing anime films in Japan. The revenue earned from the films funded Toho's other film projects. Each film was adapted into two film comics which were released in the fourth quarter of the same year. Funimation released English dubbed versions of the first six films on Region 1 DVDs between October 3, 2006, and February 16, 2010. Bang Zoom! Entertainment has begun to release English dubs of Case Closed films through Discotek Media, starting with the Episode One TV special on July 28, 2020.

Original video animations

Two original video animations (OVA) series were produced by TMS Entertainment, Nippon Television, and Yomiuri Telecasting Corporation. The OVA series Shōnen Sunday Original Animation are yearly mail order episodes available to subscribers of Weekly Shōnen Sunday. The first Shōnen Sunday Original Animation was available in Weekly Shōnen Sundays 26th issue in 2000, with eleven OVAs released as of 2011. The first nine episodes of the OVA series were later encapsulated into four DVD volumes titled Secret Files and were released between March 24, 2006, and April 9, 2010. The second OVA series, entitled Magic File, consists of yearly direct-to-DVD releases. The first Magic File was released on April 11, 2007, and contained four episodes from the anime series. The subsequent Magic File OVAs contained an original plot with background ties related to their respective Case Closed theatrical films, beginning with the twelfth film Detective Conan: Full Score of Fear.

Television special
A two-hour television special titled Lupin the 3rd vs. Detective Conan was produced by TMS Entertainment, Nippon Television, and Yomiuri Telecasting Corporation and aired on March 27, 2009. It was first announced in the 9th issue of Weekly Shōnen Sunday in 2009. The plot follows Kudo as he investigates the death of the Queen of Vespania while Arsène Lupin III from the Lupin III series attempts to steal the Queen's crown. The special earned a household record rating of 19.5 in Japan. VAP released the special on DVD and Blu-ray Disc on July 24, 2009. The special is followed by Lupin the 3rd vs. Detective Conan: The Movie which takes place after the television special.

Video games

Case Closeds expansion into the video games industry followed behind its foray into animation. On December 27, 1996, Detective Conan: Chika Yuuenchi Satsujin Jiken was released for the Game Boy. Since then, 20 games have been released with Detective Conan: Kako Kara no Zensōkyoku Prelude set for Spring of 2012 for the Nintendo DS and PlayStation Portable. Currently, the majority of the games have only been released in Japan, though Nobilis has localized Case Closed: The Mirapolis Investigation for the PAL region. All dedicated Detective Conan games released for the Game Boy, Sony's consoles, the WonderSwan, and the Nintendo DS have been developed by Bandai. Banpresto developed the Case Closed titles on the Game Boy Color and Game Boy Advance while Marvelous Entertainment developed Case Closed: The Mirapolis Investigation.

Audio CDs

Katsuo Ono composed and arranged the music in the Case Closed animation; his works have been released on several CDs. Two image albums, comprising several songs sung by Japanese voice actors of the characters in the animation, were also released. Several theme music were performed by pop musicians such as B'z, Zard, and Garnet Crow. The first four theme music were released by Universal Music Group and all releases thereafter were by Being Inc.

The Best of Detective Conan and The Best of Detective Conan 2 albums collectively sold over 2.2million copies, while singles from The Best of Detective Conan 3 collectively sold over 1.6million copies. On July 25, 2017, the singer Mai Kuraki was awarded a Guinness World Record for singing the most theme songs in a single anime series, having sung 21 songs for Detective Conan, starting with her hit song "Secret of My Heart" (2000).

Live-action drama

Four live action drama TV specials and a TV series were created by Yomiuri Telecasting Corporation and TMS entertainment based on the series. The first two specials aired in 2006 and 2007 featuring Shun Oguri portraying the teenage Jimmy Kudo and Tomoka Kurokawa as Rachel Moore. The third and fourth TV specials aired in 2011 and 2012 featuring Junpei Mizobata as Jimmy and Shioli Kutsuna as Rachel. The cast used for those TV specials were used for the television series which aired between July 7, 2011 and September 29, 2011.

Other related media

In celebration of the 50th anniversary of Weekly Shōnen Sunday and Weekly Shōnen Magazine, the two companies collaborated to publish twelve biweekly magazines consisting of chapters from Weekly Shōnen Sundays Case Closed and Weekly Shōnen Magazines Kindaichi Case Files. The magazine ran between April 10, 2008, and September 25, 2008.

Shogakukan have also produced many books spun off from the series. Fifty volumes of a film comic series were published in Japan between June 1996 and August 2000, covering the first 143 episodes of the anime, though some episodes were skipped. Five additional film comics entitled  were published between July 2001 and January 2002 and covered selected episodes between 162–219. Thirteen official guide books were published between June 1997 and April 2009. Shogakukan has also published novels, digest books, educational books, and puzzle books.

In North America, Score Entertainment published the Case Closed Trading Card Game on June 29, 2005. The game entails the use of three customized decks of cards, which players buy and collect. Representing characters, events, and objects in Case Closed, these cards are used by players to fulfill certain conditions to solve a case and win the game. Certain cards are used to foil the progress of the player's opponents. An English unofficial guidebook to the series titled The Case Closed Casebook: An Essential Guide was published by DH Publishing Inc. on March 25, 2008. A collaborative themed event by Universal Studios Japan with the series, for the Universal Cool Japan 2018 attractions, ran from January 19 to June 24, 2018. Characters from the series were featured in a crossover event for the survival horror video game Identity V for the game's China server in 2020, and released globally in 2021.

Reception

Popularity
The series has ranked on the "Book of the Year" list from Media Factory's Da Vinci magazine, where professional book reviewers, bookstore employees, and Da Vinci readers participate; it ranked 5th in 2012; 11th in 2014; 4th in 2015; 6th in 2016; 5th in 2017; 1st in 2018; 5th in 2019; 6th in 2020; 10th in 2021; and 5th in 2022. On TV Asahi's Manga Sōsenkyo 2021 poll, in which 150.000 people voted for their top 100 manga series, Case Closed ranked fourth, behind One Piece, Demon Slayer: Kimetsu no Yaiba and Slam Dunk.

The animated adaptation of the series was also popular in Japan, appearing in the top six of Japanese TV Rankings at various times. The television series ranked among the top twenty in polls conducted by anime magazine Animage from 1996 to 2001. It also placed better than twenty-third in polls for the Top 100 anime conducted by Japanese television network TV Asahi in 2005–06. The series received considerable airtime in China; it was the second most broadcast animation there in 2004.

In 2006, the Japanese government used Conan in campaigns to help promote crime awareness among children. Targeting the same audience, Japan's Ministry of Foreign Affairs used Conan and his friends in two pamphlets: one to promote the ministry's mission, the other to introduce the 34th G8 summit held in the country in 2010. Several characters in the series featured in the sixth installment of the Anime, Heroes and Heroines commemorative stamp series issued by Japan Post in 2006. Aoyama and his creations are celebrated in his hometown Hokuei, Tottori; a museum with exhibits of his work is located there, and several bronze statues of Jimmy Kudo, Conan Edogawa, and Rachel Moore are installed in various locations throughout the town. It also has other tourist attractions related to Detective Conan, including a Detective Conan themed airport and train station, and it is promoted as Conan Town.

In 2018, Case Closed caught the attention of American late night talk show host Conan O'Brien, who discussed the character Conan Edogawa as well as Conan Town in his talk show Conan, and visited the town in September 2018.

Sales
By October 2021, the Case Closed manga had over 250 million copies in circulation worldwide, making it the fourth best-selling manga series, having been sold in 25 countries. By January 2023, the manga had over 270 million copies in circulation worldwide. In Japan, individual volumes frequently appear on the lists of best-selling manga. Case Closed was the 19th best selling manga in 2011, with 2,120,091 copies sold. Nikkei Entertainment magazine published a list of top 50 manga creators by sales since January 2010, in its September 2011 issue; Gosho Aoyama, the author of Case Closed was ranked 16th, with 3,320,000 copies sold. It was the 17th best selling manga in 2012, with 2,430,572 copies sold. In 2013 Case Closed became the 24th best selling manga, with 1,966,206 copies sold.

Licensed merchandise based on Detective Conan are sold in Asia. In Japan, Detective Conan licensed merchandise sold  in 2003,  during 20052008, and  during 20102012, adding up to at least  sold in Japan between 2003 and 2012. The first volume of Case Closed appeared thrice in the top ten selling lists, right after its premiere, the same volume has also appeared in the Diamond Comic Distributors's ranking list. Later-published volumes have appeared on the New York Times Manga Best Sellers lists. Case Closed is one of the best-selling manga in Vietnam, with volumes 93–96, surpassing the 1.5 million digital copies each as of 2020.

Historical and cultural significance
Case Closed began its publication during the "Lost Decade", which was a long period of economic recession in Japan during the 1990s after the economic bubble of the 1980s burst. During this period, Japan also saw an increase in violent crimes committed by teenagers which was a growing cause for concern. The political and cultural turmoil of this period contributed to the widespread popularity of Case Closed in Japan, where audiences wished to escape from these crises. The "boy detective" trope made a resurgence in this decade and has remained popular since. The story of Case Closed is often read as an optimistic view of the capacity of children to improve society and to inspire hope for the future. The adult detectives and police officers in Case Closed are shown to be inept at solving crimes and it is ultimately Conan and the Junior Detective Club who solve cases and inspire the child audience to do the same. This can influence children and young adults’ perceptions of the police and other authorities. It can also generate a positive view of vigilante justice and anti-police sentiments in children that may undermine authoritative figures.

Case Closed has clear influences from western and eastern cultures, and it attempts to unite the two and show a modernized Japan. The designs of the characters in Case Closed are inspired by western styles, such as Conan and Richard's suits or Rachel's hairstyle, while the backgrounds show a modern, urbanized Japanese landscape. At the same time, characters also take part in traditional Japanese customs such as using chopsticks when eating or using traditional greetings when characters return to their homes. These practices demonstrate to the audience that modernity and tradition can function together.

Case Closed  uses Japanese pop music (J-pop) in its opening and ending songs. Prior to the mid 1990s, anime music was considered its own genre and was separate from J-pop. Case Closed was one of the first anime programs to include J-pop specifically in the program. As a result, today J-pop is much more commonly used in anime and J-pop artists frequently use anime as a promotional platform for their work.

Case Closed features Japanese landmarks throughout the show as the setting for many episodes. The characters visit religious temples, beaches, mountain ranges and many other real and fictionalized locations in Japan that demonstrate the country's natural beauty and historical landmarks. Case Closed episodes also include elements of Japanese folklore such as the Tengu and the Shinigami, as well as more globally recognizable figures like aliens and vampires. However, the existence of these creatures is always debunked as part of the criminal's plan in an episode.

Critical response
In the United States, Case Closed received praises from Mania.com's Eduardo M. Chavez and IGN's A. E. Sparrow for its stories—telling the mysteries and how they were unfolded by the investigations of Conan and gang. Sparrow called the style of the series a mix of Scooby-Doo and Sherlock Holmes, while Chavez believed the manga had appeal to readers of all ages. Melissa Sternenberg from THEM Anime Reviews gave the series 5 out of 5 stars, she praised its animation and plot, and described it as "what puts Detective Conan as my all-time favorite anime is the superb writing. I soak up Detective Conan like a good book, I get so drawn into every episode that everything around me just sinks away and it is just me and the episode. It is engrossing. I can not think of another word for it. Like I said, every episode is fresh, and every mystery that is solved is profound. The kid is a prodigy, and you can not blink while watching an episode of this wonderful series".

ActiveAnime's reviewers commented on complex character design and the "spirit" that the series has, indicating that fans of serialized mystery shows would rather enjoy it. The series is also said to better suit the more matured audience. Lori Lancaster of Mania.com described Case Closed as "a clever series that had mysteries at every corner", noting the "bizarre" and "interesting" nature of each case. IGN's Chris Wyatt was positive to the manner the cases were set up, relating them to Agatha Christie's locked-room mysteries. He described the series as "Inspector Gadget meets Law & Order but in an anime style".

In the United States, the dubbed series faced several negative reactions toward its changes to localize the content for international English-speaking audiences, mostly North American. Jeffrey Harris of IGN found it pointless to change the names of the characters, and Anime News Network'''s Carl Kimlinger said that the changes of certain Japanese cultural references rendered several parts of the mysteries and their investigation illogical. The voice-overs proved to be a mixed bag for Carlo Santos, who reviewed the first DVD release of Case Closed for Anime News Network; he said that while the main characters sounded like "real people", the secondary ones "[came] off as caricatures".

Accolades
The Case Closed manga series was awarded the 46th Shogakukan Manga Award in the shōnen category in 2001. It respondents in an online poll for Japanese citizens in their mid-twenties voted Case Closed'' as one of the top three manga they wanted to continue running in publication. In France, the series was nominated for the Angoulême Festival Graphic Novel award among the Japanese selection. The series ranked on About.com's top continuing manga series of 2010, under the title "Best Underappreciated Gem: Shonen" category.

Several of the franchise's films were nominated for awards in their home country. The ninth film was nominated for the feature film category at the 5th Annual Tokyo Anime Awards, and the next five films were nominees for the Japan Academy Prize for Animation of the Year in their respective years of release.

Notes

References

Bibliography

External links

 Manga
  
 Viz Media manga site
 

 Anime
 Official anime website of TMS Entertainment
 Official anime website of TMS Entertainment 
 Official Crunchyroll anime website
 Official YTV anime web site 
 Official Case Closed movies web site 

 Live drama
 Official YTV live drama web site 

 
1994 manga
1996 anime television series debuts
2011 Japanese television series debuts
Animated mystery television series
Anime series based on manga
Detective anime and manga 
Funimation
Japanese television dramas based on manga
Manga adapted into films
Rapid human age change in fiction
Shogakukan franchises
Shogakukan manga
Shōnen manga
Fiction about size change
Thriller anime and manga
TMS Entertainment
Viz Media manga
Winners of the Shogakukan Manga Award for shōnen manga
Yomiuri Telecasting Corporation original programming